The 2012 Professional Hockey League All-Star Game (Matchu Zirok)  was the first All-Star game for the 2011–12 season of the Professional Hockey League (PHL). It took place on 22 January 2012 13:00 UTC at the Palace of Sports in Kyiv, Ukraine.

See also
Professional Hockey League

References

External links
 League official homepage

PHL All-Star Game
PHL All-Star Game
PHL All-Star Game
Ice hockey all-star games